Hypopta brunneomaculata is a moth in the family Cossidae. It is found in Peru.

References

Hypopta
Moths described in 1937